Ambassador of the Shadows is volume six in the French comic (or bande dessinée) science fiction series Valérian and Laureline created by writer Pierre Christin and artist Jean-Claude Mézières.

Synopsis

Valérian and Laureline are travelling to Point Central with Earth's new Ambassador. Shortly before they arrive, the Ambassador calls them into his quarters for a meeting. He informs them that he intends to take advantage of the fact that it's Earth's turn to preside over the council at Point Central – he intends to bring order to the galaxy by proposing a federation with Earth as the keystone and police. He reminds the two young agents of the importance that he is protected. He also entrusts Laureline with the source of their funds while they are on Point Central – a Grumpy Converter from Bluxte, a small hedgehog-like creature that can defecate multiple copies of anything it eats.

The astroship lands at Point Central and the three Terrans spacewalk to the Earth's segment. Entering, they are greeted by the assembled dignitaries that occupy the segment. The Ambassador begins his opening speech but, suddenly, the partition wall melts and a group of armed aliens burst in, opening fire with cocoon guns from Xoxos. The cocoons envelop everyone present rendering them unconscious except for Valérian and Laureline who react in time to put their spacesuit helmets back on. Laureline is trapped by one of the cocoons so Valérian is forced to pursue the aliens, who have taken the Ambassador, alone. Following them to their ship, he is captured and the ship blasts off into space.

Freeing herself from her cocoon, Laureline is dismayed to discover Valérian has gone. There is one other survivor of the attack – Colonel Diol, the assistant head of protocol. Suddenly there is a ring on the main lock chamber of the segment. Diol is horrified – each race usually stays in its segment and only communicates with the others via the screens. Three small aliens enter and introduce themselves as the Shingouz. They have come to offer their services to the Ambassador as vendors of information. Laureline shows them the devastation wrought by the attack and asks them what they know. Using the Grumpy, Laureline pays them in Ebaba pearls and they suggest she tries asking the Kamuniks, allies of Earth. For a further payment of pearls they give her a map of Point Central. The map has a large unmarked white section. When she complains that the map is incomplete, the Shingouz tell her no such map exists.

Laureline leaves the Earth segment with Diol and heads for the Kamunik segment. The passageways between the segments are home to the Zools – mute beings whose planet was destroyed thousands of years ago and who now act as maintenance personnel for Point Central. The Kamuniks tell Laureline that the Suffuss have reported a large gathering of Bagoulins in their segment. Bagoulins are mercenaries and would be the sort to use cocoon guns.

The Suffuss's segment is unusual compared with the others – it is a place of ill-repute that attracts the denizens of many of the other segments. Laureline is offered a chance to try out a simulation of Earth. Taking up the offer, she pulls a gun on one of the apparently human males provided. The Suffuss reveal their true nature – they are shape-shifters. Laureline asks them for help in spying on the Bagoulins. They agree, in return for payment in aphrodisiac tablets from Txil. The Suffuss surrounds Laureline and takes the shape of a Bagoulin female. Entering the room where the Bagoulins are celebrating, Laureline has arrived just in time – the Bagoulin shaman shows an image of a spacecraft landing on their home planet. The Ambassador and Valérian are taken out and sealed into a pair of translucent spheres before being cast into the Lake of Perfumed Waters. Out of the lake rises a Groubos spacecraft now carrying Valérian and the Ambassador.

Laureline and Diol depart in search of the Groubos. On the way, the Shingouz call them on one of the video screens. They inform them that what they need to do is capture one of the jellyfish-like Zuur pilots who keep the Groubos informed of events. Taking an armored maintenance machine from the Green Canal, Laureline and Diol enter the Groubos' segment. They capture one of the Zuurs and resurface. Laureline places the Zuur on her head and is presented with a series of images – the Groubos' spacecraft meeting another spacecraft and Valérian and the Ambassador are transferred to the new ship. The images end abruptly when the Zuur, which can only survive out of water for a few minutes, explodes.

Having reached a dead end, a dejected Laureline and Diol buy some shellfish from a fisherman. He suggests that they visit the Gniarfs-Dreamers who can project a person's mind into the mind of their choice. Laureline pays them a visit and they hook her up to one of her machines. Soon she has made contact with Valerian's mind. Still on the alien spacecraft, Valérian has managed to free himself from his sphere and then frees the Ambassador. The ship is deserted apart from the two of them. The Ambassador is anxious to get back to Point Central to deliver his speech – there are ten thousand Earth warships waiting to surround Point Central at his order to enforce the proposed federation. The spacecraft lands on an island in the middle of an ocean. They are greeted by what appear to be primitive humanoids. They explain that they built the first segment of Point Central but have since evolved and have lost interest in taking part in galactic politics. They have even forgotten their own name and the name of their planet and know themselves only as Shadows. They tell the Ambassador that they will not allow any one race to exert full control over Point Central and that they have the power to annihilate Earth's fleet if needed. The children of the island take Valérian and the Ambassador to the House of Wisdom. Suddenly the dream is interrupted.

Laureline moves on, taking Diol and the Grumpy, who by now is almost burnt-out from the effort of having to transmute so many things, and makes for the Shadows' segment which must be located in the blank section of the map she bought from the Shingouz. On the way, Laureline is surprised to see the Zools congregating for some gathering. Finally finding the entrance she arrives at the Island of the Shadows. Reaching the House of Wisdom, she finds Valérian and the Ambassador. The Ambassador is a changed man from his experience with the Shadows and now proposes to deliver a message of peace to the council.

Heading back, there are now more and more Zools gathering in the passageways. Reaching the Hall of Screens, the Ambassador enters to make his speech. Laureline is approached by one of the Shingouz. With the Grumpy dying, she has no more money but convinces the Shingouz to give up his information anyway. The Zools, fed up with corruption on Point Central, have decided to clean up matters, restore the moral code of the council and expel the profiteers. A group of Zools arrive to arrest the Shingouz. He tells Laureline not to worry – there will always be a place for people with the right information, like him.

The Ambassador emerges from the council looking upset. They would not allow him to make his speech and the council has suspended Earth's membership for 100 years: their segment is to be blown up. Laureline takes charge and orders the war-fleet to assist in Earth's withdrawal. Heading for Earth, Valérian wants to activate the main motors but Laureline is putting them to another use – regenerating the Grumpy.

Main characters
 Valérian, a spatio-temporal agent from Galaxity, future capital of Earth, in the 28th century
 Laureline, originally from France in the 11th century, now a spatio-temporal agent of Galaxity in the 28th century
 Colonel Diol, assistant protocol officer assigned to the Earth segment on Point Central. Nicknamed "Colonel Protocol" by Laureline.
 The Earth Ambassador to Point Central
 The Shingouz, three aliens who sell information about anything to anyone – at the right price
 The Grumpy Converter, a small animal from Bluxte, a planet in the Empire of a Thousand Planets. When charged up, it's able to transmute multiple copies of anything it ingests, making it useful in places where many different currencies are used.
 The Zools, mute homeless beings who work to maintain Point Central
 The Kamuniks, war-like, centaur-like allies of Earth
 The Suffuss, a race of shape-shifters
 The Bagoulin, a race of mercenaries
 The Groubos, a race of aquatic beings 
 The Gniarfs-Dreamers
 The Shadows, the mysterious beings who founded Point Central

Settings
 Point Central, a vast space station that lies at a crossroads in space. The many alien races that have come here have each added a segment to the station built to simulate their home environment. Each segment meets at a single point – the huge Hall of Screens where the representatives of each race meet to discuss their differences. In most cases, each alien race never leaves its own segment and communicates with the others only via the screens. The passageways that connect the segments are populated by the Zools, mute beings whose planet exploded long ago and who have been taking care of maintenance on Point Central for thousands of years. Also running through the passageways in places is the Green Canal which provides access to the segments occupied by the aquatic races. Fishermen ply the Green Canal in search of shellfish. Valérian and Laureline visit a number of segments during the course of their adventure:
 Earth's segment.
 The Kammuniks, a war-like race who resemble centaurs. Theirs is a feudal, medieval society. They are allies of Earth through their mutual appreciation of the arts of war. Their principal currency is blood and guts tabs from Khoul.
 The Suffuss, a race of shapeless, colourless shape-shifters. Their segment is unusual in that they openly welcome visitors as paying guests at their bordello in which they are able to offer convincing simulations of many locations and species throughout the galaxy. If the price is right, they will, reluctantly, use their shape-shifting abilities to help races spy on each other. Their principal currency is aphrodisiac tablets from Txil.
 The Groubos, an aquatic race whose segment is reached via the Green Canal. They are blind creatures who constitute a single psychic entity. They exist in a symbiotic relationship with aquatic jellyfish like creatures called Zuurs who work to keep the Groubos informed about events in the outside world.
 The Gniarfs-Dreamers, humanoids who specialise in the tailoring of artificially created dreams. Their principal currency is the Bloutok.
 The Shadows – their segment is a gateway to their home (see below).
 We also briefly see segments belonging to:
 The Rours, mathematicians whose bodies exude poisons lethal to any lifeform other than their own.
 The Marmakas, renowned as psychologists but feared for their radioactivity.
 The Pulpissms, traders whose market is famed throughout Point Central.
 The Tagliens, theologians who are consulted for religious disputes.
 The planet Bagoulin. We only get a brief glimpse of a ceremony beside the Lake of Perfumed Waters where the Groubos have landed their ship. The Bagoulin are ruled by a queen and learn wisdom from their shamans. 
 The Island of the Shadows on the Planet Without a Name. This is an island on the homeworld of the nameless race who built the first segment of Point Central.  They live on a small island in a sunny part of a vast ocean. In the blue sky is a large yellow moon. The Shadows have long since withdrawn from galactic politics and have adopted a simple, primitive lifestyle. Despite this, they keep vigil on events on Point Central and will intervene whenever a race decides it wants to take over.

Notes
 This is the first Valérian album to be credited to P. Christin. All of the preceding albums were credited under his pen-name Linus.
 The game the Kamuniks play with Laureline is based on Buzkashi, the national sport of Afghanistan.
 A number of elements of this story resurface in later albums – most notably the three Shingouz who make regular guest appearances in the series. Point Central is revisited on a number of occasions while Grumpy Converters from Bluxte are used from time to time as well.
 This album continues the thread first developed in Welcome to Alflolol that suggested that Galaxity may not be the force for good we are led to believe it is in the early albums. While Welcome to Alflolol dealt with colonialism, this album deals with imperialism. Galaxity's ambitions, as revealed in this story, will eventually lead to the events of the two part story The Ghosts of Inverloch and The Rage of Hypsis.
 This was the first Valérian story to be published in English. It was translated by L. Mitchell and serialised in Heavy Metal magazine in 1981 (Volume 4, Number 10 (January 1981) to Volume 5, Number 1 (April 1981)). It was later published in album form in 1982 by Dargaud USA in the United States of America and in 1984 by Hodder-Dargaud in the United Kingdom. The American edition included an introduction by leading French SF editor and anthologist Daniel Riche.
 This adventure, about a huge space station, at a crossroads in space, where alien ambassadors come to settle their differences but who are secretly being manipulated by an ancient race, known as the Shadows, anticipates certain aspects of the American science fiction television series, Babylon 5, created by J. Michael Straczynski, that began in 1993. It is unclear whether Straczynski ever read the story, though he is known to be a major aficionado of comic books and the publication in English of this story would coincide with the time the idea for Babylon 5 came to him.
 This album was the main inspiration for the plot of the film Valerian and the City of a Thousand Planets, despite the film's title being taken from another album.

References

1975 graphic novels
Valérian and Laureline